Air Commandant Dame Mary Henrietta Barnett  (16 February 1905 – 11 September 1985), known as Henrietta Barnett, was a senior officer of the Women's Royal Air Force (WRAF). From 1956 to 1960, she served as its director.

Military career
In 1938, Barnett joined the Auxiliary Territorial Service as a volunteer (IE private), and was assigned to No. 45 County of Oxford Company. She transferred to the Women's Auxiliary Air Force (WAAF) when it was established on 28 June 1939. She was commissioned into the WAAF as a company assistant (equivalent to a pilot officer in the Royal Air Force), with seniority from 5 December 1938. During World War II, she served at RAF Upper Heyford in Oxfordshire, at RAF Feltwell in Norfolk, and at the Air Ministry in London.

Barnett was present for the London Blitz and witnessed the destruction of the House of Commons as well as other places. At that time, she was stationed there and air women like herself worked on various tasks at the Air Ministry. Barnett states "Never once did they speak of their secret work, seldom were they late for duty, even after a raid. They were known as the Whitehall Warriors."

After the end of the war, in the summer of 1945, Barnett was posted to RAF Mediterranean Command in Caserta, Italy. There, she served as the "staff officer responsible for all WAAF personnel working in the RAF Mediterranean and Middle East command". She traveled to Vienna to seek out the possibility of stationing air women there. In October 1947, she returned to the United Kingdom and was appointed as an WAAF staff officer at Flying Training Command headquarters. On 13 November 1947, she was appointed to an extended service commission as a flight officer (equivalent to flight lieutenant) with seniority in that rank from 3 March 1943. In October 1948, she appointed the WAAF Inspector; this job required her to travel extensively, inspecting all the bases within RAF Home Command that had WAAF personnel.

In 1949, the Women's Royal Air Force (WRAF) was created. On 1 February 1949, Barnett was made a group officer (equivalent in rank to a group captain in the RAF) in the Secretary Branch of the WRAF. From 1949 to 1952, she served as one of two Deputy-Directors of the WRAF: in that role, she had responsibility for the "selection, promotion, and career and personal problems of WRAF officers". On 1 November 1952, she was appointed Commanding Officer of RAF Hawkinge; as such, she became the only female station commander in the RAF. From 1 August 1956 to March 1960, she served as Director of the Women's Royal Air Force, holding the rank of air commandant (equivalent to air commodore).

Honours
In the 1956 New Year Honours, Barnett was appointed a Commander of the Order of the British Empire (CBE). In the 1958 Queen's Birthday Honours, she was promoted to Dame Commander of the Order of the British Empire (DBE), and therefore granted the title Dame.

References

External links

Military personnel from Winchester
1905 births
1985 deaths
Women's Royal Air Force officers
Auxiliary Territorial Service soldiers
Women's Auxiliary Air Force officers
Dames Commander of the Order of the British Empire